James French may refer to:

 James B. French (1857–1932), American politician
 James M. French (1834–1916), American lawyer and politician in Virginia
 James R. French, American aerospace engineer
 James French (murderer) (c. 1936–1966), American criminal
 James French (racing driver) (born 1992), American racing driver
 James French (rugby union) (born 1998), Irish rugby union player
 James Strange French (1807–1886), lawyer, novelist and hotel keeper
 James Bruce French (1921–2002), Canadian-American theoretical physicist
 Jim French (cowboy), New Mexican cowboy
 Jim French (musician) (born 1954), American jazz musician
 Jim French (photographer) (1932–2017), American photographer of male erotica
 Jim French (radio host) (1928–2017), American radio host for KIRO (AM), writer-producer for The Adventures of Harry Nile
 Jim French (baseball) (born 1941), American baseball player
 Jim French (businessman) (born 1953), airline executive
 Jim French (footballer, born 1926) (1926–2004), English footballer
 Jim French (footballer, born 1907) (1907–?), Scottish footballer

See also
 Jim French (horse), American thoroughbred racehorse